Banuband-e Patil (also Romanized as Banūband-e Pātīl and Banū Band-e Pātīl; also known as Pātal-e Banū Band, Pātal-e Posht-e Banūband, Pātal Posht Benūband, and Pātīl Posht-e Banū Band) is a village in Tazian Rural District, in the Central District of Bandar Abbas County, Hormozgan Province, Iran. At the 2006 census, its population was 706, in 146 families.

References 

Populated places in Bandar Abbas County